The 2018 Robert Morris Colonials football team represented Robert Morris University during the 2018 NCAA Division I FCS football season. They were led by first-year head coach Bernard Clark and played their home games at Joe Walton Stadium. They were a member of the Northeast Conference. They finished the season 2–9, 0–6 in NEC play to finish in last place.

Previous season
The Colonials finished the 2017 season 2–9, 0–6 in NEC play to finish in last place.

On November 19, head coach John Banaszak announced his retirement. He finished at Robert Morris with a four-year record of 8–34.

Preseason

NEC coaches poll
The NEC released their preseason coaches poll on July 24, 2018, with the Colonials predicted to finish in last place.

Preseason All-NEC team
The Colonials placed two players on the preseason all-NEC team.

Defense

Amir Fenwick – DL

Adam Wollet – LB

Schedule

Game summaries

at Dayton

Virginia State

at James Madison

at Bryant

Central Connecticut

at Duquesne

Central State

Saint Francis (PA)

at Sacred Heart

at Eastern Kentucky

Wagner

References

Robert Morris
Robert Morris Colonials football seasons
Robert Morris Colonials football